On 23 February 1945 Turkey declared war on Nazi Germany and the Empire of Japan. It was proposed in a speech made by Turkish Prime Minister Şükrü Saracoğlu during a special session. The resolution passed unanimously by the parliament and was published on Official Gazette next day. Turkey became a party to the Declaration by United Nations at the same time.

Text of the declaration

See also 
 Declarations of war during World War II
 Diplomatic history of World War II

References

February 1945 events in Europe
1945 in Turkey
1945 in Germany
1945 in Japan
1945 in international relations
1945 in military history
1945 documents
Declarations of war during World War II
Turkey in World War II
Germany–Turkey relations
Germany in World War II
Military history of Germany during World War II
Japan–Turkey relations
Japan in World War II
Military history of Japan during World War II